Nicrophorus podagricus is a burying beetle described by Portevin in 1920.

References

External links

Silphidae
Beetles of North America
Beetles described in 1920